Adam Edwards (born May 9, 1980) is an American professional stock car racing driver and professional driving instructor.

Racing career
Edwards became interested in the mechanics of racing during his high school years and decided to pursue a career in auto racing. In 2002, he got his start into racing by becoming an owner-driver in the Pure Stock Division of the NASCAR Weekly Series. Five years later in 2007, Edwards broke into the national ranks by starting in 5 ARCA Racing Series events posting a best finish of 17th for Andy Belmont Racing at the Pocono Raceway.

Edwards partnered up with Norm Benning in 2012 and made his debut in the NASCAR Camping World Truck Series driving the No. 75 Chevrolet in a start and park effort. He finished 33rd after falling out of the race within 5 laps.

In 2014, after a two-year hiatus, Benning and Edwards reunited by attempting 5 races continuing the start and park efforts. All of his starts that year were in late field filler entries (the Truck Series had short starting fields that year in a number of races), which is why he received zero points in the 2014 standings. The following year, Edwards raced for Jennifer Jo Cobb in 2 races at the Texas Motor Speedway and the Gateway Motorsports Park.

Edwards also pursues in instructing and is a driving instructor at Andy Hillenburg's Fast Track High Performance Racing School where he coaches drivers and fans of Motorsports.

Personal life

Edwards was born in Falls Church, Virginia on May 9, 1980 and graduated from Virginia Tech in 2002. He co-authored the novel Faster Pastor with Sharyn McCrumb; the 2010 book is loosely based on his teaching experiences.

Motorsports career results

NASCAR
(key) (Bold – Pole position awarded by qualifying time. Italics – Pole position earned by points standings or practice time. * – Most laps led.)

Camping World Truck Series

 Season still in progress 
 Ineligible for series points

ARCA Re/Max Series
(key) (Bold – Pole position awarded by qualifying time. Italics – Pole position earned by points standings or practice time. * – Most laps led.)

References

External links
 

Living people
1980 births
NASCAR drivers
ARCA Menards Series drivers
People from Falls Church, Virginia
Racing drivers from Virginia